Anne Margot (Margo) Vliegenthart (born 18 July 1958 in Utrecht) is a Dutch former politician.

References
A.M. (Margo) Vliegenthart at www.parlement.com

1958 births
Living people
State Secretaries for Health of the Netherlands
Members of the House of Representatives (Netherlands)
Labour Party (Netherlands) politicians
Politicians from Utrecht (city)
Utrecht University alumni